Ms. Gsptlsnz, sometimes called Gizpy, is a fictional character who appears in American comic books published by DC Comics, commonly in association with the superhero Superman.

A variation of her Nyxlygsptlnz alias appeared in the sixth season of the Arrowverse series Supergirl, portrayed by Peta Sergeant.

Fictional character biography
A character named Miss Gzptlsnz first appeared in the comic book series Superman's Pal Jimmy Olsen. Ms. Gzptlsnz was a female imp from the same fifth-dimensional plane as Mister Mxyzptlk. The character was created by Jerry Siegel and Curt Swan, and first appeared in Superman's Pal Jimmy Olsen #52 (April 1964), where Mxyzptlk referred to her as his girlfriend, though Gzptlsnz developed a crush on Jimmy Olsen. Miss Gzptlsnz had similar implike proportions to Mxyzptlk. She reappeared in JLA #31 (July 1999) as the leader of a council of 5th dimensional imps passing judgement on Qwsp.

Gsptlsnz is later seen in "Countdown" when Mxyzptlk is pulled through a portal by Monarch, and again when Mxyzptlk escapes.

The New 52
In 2011, "The New 52" rebooted the DC universe. In the first issue of the relaunched Action Comics, an elderly character named Mrs. Nyxly was introduced as Clark Kent's landlady. She is revealed to know Clark's secret identity as Superman.

After Clark's apparent death while attempting to save a man from committing suicide, she is revealed to be a princess from the fifth dimension. Her real name is Nyxlygsptlnz, also referred to as Ms. Gspltlnz, and she is the wife of Mr. Mxyzptlk and daughter of King Brpxz. She grants Clark a wish, and makes everyone forget that Clark Kent's death occurred. She is also revealed to be aunt of Ferlin Nyxly, a Superman villain and museum curator also reintroduced to the new continuity.

Another character from the fifth dimension, Vyndktvx, is hunting her and Superman as revenge for Mxyzptlk stealing his reputation and fiance. She is shot and killed after she tells Clark the story of how she came to Earth and the events that led to Vyndktvx's evil motives.

Powers and abilities
Like all fifth-dimensional imps, Ms. Gsptlsnz possesses the same powers and weaknesses as her boyfriend, Mister Mxyzptlk. She can fly, teleport, and manipulate reality (such as changing clothes by the snap of her fingers).

In other media

 Ms. Gsptlsnz appears in Superman: The Animated Series episodes "Mxyzpixilated" and "Little Big Head Man", voiced by Sandra Bernhard in the former and Jennifer Hale in the latter. This version is Mxyzptlk's girlfriend, and  indifferent to mortal affairs.
 Nyxlygsptlnz, also known as "Nyxly", appears in the sixth season of Supergirl, portrayed by Peta Sergeant. This version was a princess of the 5th dimension who was banished to the Phantom Zone by her father King Brpxz sometime prior to the series before she is rescued by Supergirl and attempts to return to the 5th dimension to seek revenge on Brpxz. Despite being foiled by Supergirl, losing her powers, and presumed dead in an explosion, Nyxly secretly survives and collaborates with a hunter named Mitch and Dr. Desmond Raab to trap Supergirl with a cryo-bomb and regain her powers. Mxyzptlk intervenes, but is defeated and absorbed by Nyxly, who joins forces with Lex Luthor to find seven magic totems that will grant her unlimited power, only for the pair to be dragged into the Phantom Zone.

References

 Gina Renée Misiroglu, Michael Eury (2006) The supervillain book: the evil side of comics and Hollywood (Visible Ink Press) ,
 Andi Zeisler (2008) Feminism and pop culture, Seal Studies, (Seal Press) 

DC Comics aliens
DC Comics female supervillains
DC Comics deities
DC Comics extraterrestrial supervillains
DC Comics characters who can teleport
DC Comics characters who use magic
Fictional characters who can manipulate reality
Fictional immigrants to the United States
Fictional gamblers
Fictional higher-dimensional characters
Fictional tricksters
Comics characters introduced in 1964